Château-Larcher (Poitevin: Chât'lachèr / Chatelarchér) is a commune in the Vienne department in the Nouvelle-Aquitaine region in western France.

Geography
The Clouère flows northwestward through the middle of the commune, forms part of its north-eastern border, then flows into the Clain, which forms its north-western border.

See also
Communes of the Vienne department

References

Communes of Vienne